Huang Hsien-yung (born 12 December 1993 in Taipei County (now New Taipei City), Taiwan) is a female Taiwanese athlete. She won the gold medal in the women's finweight (under 46 kg) at the 2010 Asian Games at the age of 16. Huang surprisingly dominated South Korean champion Hwang Mi-Na 7-2 in the first round, and upset Olympic silver medalist Buttree Puedpong of Thailand 3-0 in the quarterfinals.

References

1993 births
Living people
Sportspeople from New Taipei
Taiwanese female taekwondo practitioners
Asian Games medalists in taekwondo
Taekwondo practitioners at the 2010 Asian Games
Asian Games gold medalists for Chinese Taipei
Medalists at the 2010 Asian Games
21st-century Taiwanese women